Bazmak-e Sofla (also Romanized as Bazmak-e Soflá; also known as Bazmak-e Pā’īn) is a village in Sornabad Rural District, Hamaijan District, Sepidan County, Fars Province, Iran. At the 2006 census, its population was 52, in 13 families.

References 

Populated places in Sepidan County